Kathrin Muegge is a German physician and molecular biologist researching chromatin organization during embryonic development and in tumor progression. She is a senior investigator and head of the epigenetics section at the Frederick National Laboratory for Cancer Research.

Education 
Kathrin Muegge obtained a M.D. degree at the Hannover Medical School.

Career and research 

As a principal investigator at the Frederick National Laboratory for Cancer Research she investigates in the Laboratory of Cancer Prevention chromatin organization during embryonic development and in tumor progression. She is a senior investigator in the mouse cancer genetics program and head of the epigenetics section.

Muegge studies molecular mechanisms that alter chromatin structure and function during murine development. She discovered several links between chromatin modifiers, including nucleosomal remodeling and DNA methylation. The work focuses on chromatin changes during normal cellular differentiation and during the reverse process of nuclear reprogramming. Her studies provide insights how stable gene expression is achieved, how cells maintain a proper phenotype, and how this process may be disturbed in pathologic conditions including cancer.

References 

Living people
Year of birth missing (living people)
Place of birth missing (living people)
National Institutes of Health people
21st-century women scientists
Women medical researchers
German medical researchers
Cancer researchers
21st-century biologists
German molecular biologists
Women molecular biologists
German women biologists
German emigrants to the United States
Expatriate academics in the United States
21st-century German physicians
German women physicians
21st-century women physicians
21st-century German women